Chisamba is a constituency of the National Assembly of Zambia. It covers Chisamba in Chisamba District of Central Province.

List of MPs

Election results

References

Constituencies of the National Assembly of Zambia
Constituencies established in 1964
1964 establishments in Zambia